Robin Geiss (born November 8, 1974)  is a German academic specializing in public international law. In 2021, he was appointed by United Nations Secretary-General António Guterres as Director of the United Nations Institute for Disarmament Research. Prior to this, Geiss held various academic appointments including as Swiss Chair of International Humanitarian Law at the Geneva Academy of International Humanitarian Law and Human Rights and Director of the Glasgow Centre for International Law and Security at the University of Glasgow.

Early life and education 
Geiss studied law at the University of Edinburgh, the University of Kiel (Ph.D. 2003) and at the New York University (LL.M. 2004). He has been a scholar of the German Academic Scholarship Foundation (Studienstiftung) and the recipient of a Marie Curie Postdoctoral Fellowship.

Career 
Prior to his appointment as Director of UNIDIR, Geiss was Professor of International Law and Security and Director of the Glasgow Centre for International Law and Security (GCILS) at the University of Glasgow where he retains a role as Affiliate Professor at the School of Law. He is the founding Director of the Erasmus Mundus Programme in International Law of Global Security, Peace and Development.

As Swiss Chair of International Humanitarian Law (2020-2021), Geiss initiated the “disruptive military technologies” workstream at the Geneva Academy of International Humanitarian Law and Human Rights, and from 2017 to 2021 he was a visiting professor at the Paris School of International Affairs at Sciences Po in Paris.

Other academic appointments have included visiting professor at the University of Vienna (2017), Professor of Public International and European Law at the University of Potsdam (2011-2013) and Visiting Fellow at the German Institute for International and Security Affairs (SWP) in Berlin (2016), and from 2014 to 2017 Geiss served as Research Project Director for the Collaborative Research Center “Governance in Areas of Limited Statehood” (SFB 700) at the Freie Universität Berlin.

Geiss was one of the international experts who, under the auspices of the Tallinn-based NATO Cooperative Cyber Defence Centre of Excellence, drafted the "Tallinn Manual", which investigates how international law applies in cyber space. He also served as a member of the scientific advisory boards of the German Institute for International and Security Affairs (SWP), the Leibniz Science Campus on Europe and America in the Modern World, the German Foundation for Peace Research and the German Red Cross’ National Committee on International Humanitarian Law. He is an ex officio member of the United Nations Secretary General's advisory board on Disarmament Matters.

From 2004 to 2005 and again from 2007 to 2010, Geiss worked as Legal Adviser for the International Committee of the Red Cross (ICRC) Legal Division and as ICRC delegate to the United Nations Human Rights Council. From 2014 to 2021 he served as co-editor of the Yearbook of International Humanitarian Law.

See also 

 United Nations Institute for Disarmament Research
 International humanitarian law

Selected publications

References

External links 
 Profile on the website of the United Nations Institute of Disarmament Research
 Profile on the website of the University of Glasgow
 Profile on the website of the Glasgow Centre for International Law and Security

Living people
1974 births
International law scholars
Academics of the University of Glasgow